Klaus Langhoff (born December 5, 1939) is an East German former handball player who competed in the 1972 Summer Olympics.

He was born in Rostock.

In 1972 he was part of the East German team which finished fourth in the Olympic tournament. He played all six matches and scored six goals.

External links
 profile

1939 births
Living people
German male handball players
Olympic handball players of East Germany
Handball players at the 1972 Summer Olympics
Sportspeople from Rostock